Max Czollek (born 6 May 1987 in East Berlin) is a German lyric-poet, writer and stage performer. He is a member of the "G13" authors' collective.

Life 
Max Czollek attended the Jewish Upper School  in Berlin, passing his school finals in 2006. During his time at school he took a year abroad in Texas. Between 2007 and 2012 he studied political sciences at Berlin. Then, from 2012 to 2016 he worked on his doctorate at the Center for Research on Antisemitism (TU Berlin) and at Birkbeck, University of London. He was supported with a stipend from the Ernst Ludwig Ehrlich Scholarship Fund. Since 2016 he has been a member of the producers' collective "Jalta – Positionen zur jüdischen Gegenwart" ("Yalta - Positions on the Jewish Present").

Czollek has been part of the lyric-poetry collective G13 since 2009. In 2013 he initiated the international "Babelsprech" lyric-poetry project, in order to network a young German language "lyric scene".

Since 2014 he has teamed up with the novelist Deniz Utlu to organize the literature series "Gegenwartsbewältigung" at the Maxim Gorki Theater (Studio Я). Together with "Sasha"/"Саша" Marianna Salzmann he was co-instigator of the "Disintegration Congress" (2016) on contemporary Jewish thinking and of the "Radical Jewish Arts Days" ("Radikale Jüdische Kulturtage" 2017). During 2016/2017 he was co-leader with Esra Kücük of the Maxim Gorki Theater's "Young Berlin Council" project.

Notes

References

German poets
Writers from Berlin
1987 births
Living people
German Jews